The 2019–20 George Washington Colonials men's basketball team represented George Washington University during the 2019–20 NCAA Division I men's basketball season. The Colonials were led by first-year head coach Jamion Christian and played their home games at the Charles E. Smith Center in Washington, D.C. as members of the Atlantic 10 Conference.

George Washington finished the season with a 12–20 record and a 6–12 record in Atlantic 10 play. They were eliminated by Fordham in the opening round of the 2020 Atlantic 10 men's basketball tournament.

Previous season
The Colonials finished the 2018–19 season 9–24, 4–14 in A-10 play to finish in a tie for 12th place. As the No. 12 seed, they defeated Massachusetts in the first round of the A-10 tournament before losing to George Mason in the second round.

George Washington parted ways with Maurice Joseph on March 15, 2019, after three seasons and an overall record of 44–57. On March 21, the school hired Siena head coach Jamion Christian as the new head coach.

Offseason

Departures

Incoming transfers

2019 recruiting class

2020 Recruiting class

Roster

Schedule and results

|-
!colspan=9 style=|Exhibition

|-
!colspan=12 style=| Non-conference regular season

|-
!colspan=12 style=| Atlantic 10 regular season

|-
!colspan=9 style=|Atlantic 10 tournament

Source

References

George Washington Colonials men's basketball seasons
George Washington
George Washington Colonials men's basketball team
George Washington Colonials men's basketball team